(), known simply as Club Brugge (in English also: Club Bruges), is a Belgian professional football club based in Bruges, Belgium. It was founded in 1891 and its home ground is the Jan Breydel Stadium, which has a capacity of 29,062. They play in, and are the reigning champions of Belgian First Division A, the top domestic league in Belgian football.

One of the most decorated clubs in Belgian football, the club have been crowned Belgian league champions 18 times, second only to major rivals Anderlecht, and it shares the Jan Breydel Stadium with city rival Cercle Brugge, with whom they contest the Bruges derby.

Throughout its long history, "Club" has enjoyed much European football success, reaching two European finals and two European semi-finals. Club Brugge is the only Belgian club to have played the final of the European Cup (now the UEFA Champions League) so far, losing to Liverpool in the final of the 1978 season. They also lost in the 1976 UEFA Cup Final to the same opponents. Club Brugge holds the European record number of consecutive participations in the UEFA Europa League (20), the record number of Belgian Cups (11), and the record number of Belgian Super Cups (17). They would also qualify for the 2022–23 UEFA Champions League knockout for the first time in the modern history.

History

In 1890, students from the Catholic school Broeders Xaverianen and the neutral school Koninklijk Atheneum joined together to form the Brugsche Football Club. The former students christened the club's founding by establishing the Latin motto 'mens sana in corpore sano' (a healthy mind in a healthy body). A year later on 13 November 1891, the club was re-created under Brugsche FC, and this is now seen as the official foundation of the current Club Brugge. In 1892, an official board was installed at the club to oversee all operations and team decisions. In 1895, the national athletics sports union was founded, predecessor of the later national football association, under the name UBSSA (Union Belge des Sociétés de Sports Athlétiques); Brugsche FC was a founding member of the UBSSSA and as such took part in the first league campaign organized in Belgian football during the 1895–96 season. Financial difficulties the following year forced the club to leave the UBSSA and soon after, Football Club Brugeois were formed by breakaway club members. The two sides were reunited in 1897 under the French name of Football Club Brugeois; they did not take on the Dutch title Club Brugge until 1972.

In 1914, FC Brugeois reached their first Belgian Cup final, but lost 2–1 to Union SG. Six years later, the club claimed their first trophy, by winning the Belgian First Division during the 1919–20 season. They celebrated by changing their title to Royal FC Brugeois – with their regal status now reflected in their modern prefix KV, standing for Koninklijke Vereniging (royal club). Only eight years later though, the club was relegated to the Belgian Second Division for the first time in their history following a relegation play-off. Further lean times followed the relegation in 1928, as they spent much of the 1940s and 1950s in the second division of Belgian football.

Following the 1958–59 season, the club earned promotion back to the First Division and have not been relegated since. The club were able to add to their trophy cabinet in 1968, winning the first of their record 11 Belgian Cup titles for the first time after defeating Beerschot A.C. 7–6 in a penalty-shootout after a 1–1 draw.

The club enjoyed their most success under legendary Austrian manager Ernst Happel as he led the club to three straight league championships from 1975–76 to 1977–78 and a Belgian Cup victory in 1976–77. Happel also guided Club Brugge to their first European final, reaching the 1976 UEFA Cup Final. Over the two-legged final against English giants Liverpool, Club Brugge fell 3–4 on aggregate. Two years later, Brugge again met Liverpool in a European final, this time in the 1978 European Cup Final at Wembley, becoming the first Belgian club to reach the final of the competition. Brugge fell to a lone second-half goal from Kenny Dalglish as Liverpool won their second European Cup and third European trophy in succession. Following the cup final loss to Liverpool, Happel left Club Brugge and would lead Netherlands later that summer to the final of the 1978 FIFA World Cup.

On 25 November 1992, Brugge player Daniel Amokachi became the first goal scorer in the Champions League. He scored in a 1–0 win over CSKA Moscow.

On 20 May 2021, Brugge drew 3–3 with rivals Anderlecht to win the Belgian First Division A title for the fourth time in six years and 17th time overall. It was the first time since 1973 that Club Brugge had been crowned champions at Anderlecht's ground and the first time since 1976–77 and 1977–78 that Brugge had won back-to-back league titles.

Crest and colours

The club don a blue and black home kit as has been traditional through their history. Away from home they wear a light coloured kit. Colours like white, light blue and yellow have been used in recent years. As of the 2022–23 season, the club's current kit supplier is Macron.

Stadium

The club's original home in the Sint-Andries district of Bruges was known as the Rattenplein (rats' stadium) since it was owned by the local fox terrier club, who used it for another imported English pastime: rat baiting. This non-UEFA affiliated 'sport' involved getting dogs to chase and kill rats. In 1911, the team moved to a new ground, called De Klokke (after a nearby pub), which was renamed the Albert Dyserynckstadion after the sudden death of Club Brugge chairman Albert Dyserynck.

Their current stadium, since 1975, was rebranded in honour of local butcher and revolutionary Jan Breydel in 1998. Breydel led a rising against the city's French overlords in the 1300s. The venue – which Club Brugge share with local rivals Cercle Brugge – was previously named the Olympiastadion.

In November 2016, the club broke ground on a new training complex at Westkapelle, including four training pitches and an additional training centre for the senior squad plus the U21 and U19 teams; all in addition to the already available sports complex Molenhoek.

New stadium 
Since 2007, Club Brugge has been working on developing a new stadium. Since then, there have been a number of proposed locations, but the project never really took off due to problems with ground availability and endangered animal species on the proposed grounds. 

However, when a new city council and mayor were sworn into office in the city of Bruges, the project went through a rebirth. Instead of moving out of the current Jan Breydelstadium, the site on which this stadium is built will be completely reconstructed into a park with a brand new stadium next to where the current stadium is situated. Although this project has been criticised by some, it's the furthest the club has come with a project. In October of 2021 the club received their building permit. The club, the city and the Flemish government aim to have a functioning stadium by mid-2023, which will hold up to 40,116 spectators.

Supporters

Some of the fans are part of 62 supporter clubs in Belgium, which have more than 10,000 members. The "Supportersfederatie Club Brugge KV", founded in 1967, is recognized as the official supporters club of Club Brugge. The federation is made up of 60 recognized supporters' clubs and has an elected board to steer the operation in the right direction.

In tribute to the fans, often dubbed the twelfth man in football, Club Brugge no longer assigns the number 12 to players. Club Brugge also has a TV show, CLUBtv, on the Telenet network since 21 July 2006. This twice weekly show features exclusive interviews with players, coaches and managers.

Mascot

The official mascot of Club Bruges is a bear, symbol of the city of Bruges. The history of the bear is related to a legend of the first Count of Flanders, Baldwin I of Flanders, who had fought and defeated a bear in his youth. Since the end of 2000, a second mascot, also a bear, travels along the edge of the field during home games for fans to call and encourage both their favorites. These two bears are called Belle and Bene. In 2010, a third bear named Bibi, made its appearance. He is described as the child of the first two mascots, and is oriented towards the young supporters.

Rivalries

Like many historic clubs, Club Brugge contests rivalries with other Belgian clubs, whether at local (Cercle Brugge) or regional level (Ghent and Antwerp) or nationally competitive (Anderlecht and Standard Liège).

Anderlecht

The rivalry between Club Brugge and Anderlecht has developed since the 1970s. At that time, the Brussels-based club and Club Brugge won most trophies between them, leaving little room for other Belgian teams. Matches between these two teams were often contested for the title of champion of Belgium. Three Belgian Cup finals were played between the two clubs (with Anderlecht winning once and Club Brugge twice), and they played seven Belgian Supercups (Club Bruges won five). A match between these two sides is often called 'The Hate Game'. They are arguably the most heated fixtures in Belgian football together with clashes between the other two members of the Big Three - Anderlecht and Standard Liège.

Cercle Brugge 
The Bruges Derby is seen as one of the most important games of the season for a lot of fans from both teams. Every season, the game attracts a huge deal of fans which results in huge choreographies on both sides. Tifos, flags and banners made specifically for this confrontation and accompanied by flares and smoke bombs aren't a rare sight in and around the stadium. The winner of this derby is crowned "de Ploeg van Brugge", which translates to "the team of Bruges". It has become a tradition for the winning side to plant a flag with the club's crest or colours on the center spot after the game.

R. Antwerp FC 
The rivalry between the oldest clubs in Flanders and Belgium, is one that dates back to the 1900s. In 1908, due to Bruges supporters attacking Antwerp players after they had lost 2-1 to what we'll later call Club Brugge, one of the biggest and fiercest rivalries in Europe came to be. Confrontations between the two sides bring a lot of fighting and havoc to the stadium and the surrounding neighbourhoods. This hatred has reached new highs ever since Antwerp gained promotion back to the first division.

Honours

Domestic
Belgian First Division
Winners (18): 1919–20, 1972–73, 1975–76, 1976–77, 1977–78, 1979–80, 1987–88, 1989–90, 1991–92, 1995–96, 1997–98, 2002–03, 2004–05, 2015–16, 2017–18, 2019–20, 2020–21, 2021–22
Runners-up (23): 1898–99, 1899-1900, 1905–06, 1909–10, 1910–11, 1966–67, 1967–68, 1969–70, 1970–71, 1971–72, 1984–85, 1985–86, 1993–94, 1996–97, 1998–99, 1999-2000, 2000–01, 2001–02, 2003–04, 2011–12, 2014–15, 2016–17, 2018–19

Belgian Cup
Winners (11): 1967–68, 1969–70, 1976–77, 1985–86, 1990–91, 1994–95, 1995–96, 2001–02, 2003–04, 2006–07, 2014–15 (record)
Runners-up (8): 1913–14, 1978–79, 1982–83, 1993–94, 1997–98, 2004–05, 2015–16, 2019–20

Belgian Super Cup
Winners (17): 1980, 1986, 1988, 1990, 1991, 1992, 1994, 1996, 1998, 2002, 2003, 2004, 2005, 2016, 2018, 2021, 2022 (record)
Runners-up (3): 1995, 2007, 2015

International

European Cup
Runners-up: 1977–78

UEFA Cup
Runners-up: 1975–76
Semi-finalists: 1987–88

UEFA Cup Winners' Cup
Semi-finalists: 1991–92

Minor
Kirin Cup
Winners: 1981

Amsterdam Tournament
Winners: 1990

Results

Players

First-team squad

Out on loan

Club NXT (Reserves and Youth Academy)

Retired numbers

12 – The 12th man (reserved for the club supporters)

23 –  François Sterchele, striker (2007–08). Posthumous; Sterchele died in a single-person car accident on 8 May 2008.

Former players

Club captains

Coaching staff

First-team staff

Reserves staff

Club Academy staff

Board of Directors

See also
Club YLA (Club Brugge women)

References

Bibliography

External links

  

 
Association football clubs established in 1891
1891 establishments in Belgium
Football clubs in Bruges
Organisations based in Belgium with royal patronage
Belgian Pro League clubs